The Women's 75 kg competition at the 2017 World Weightlifting Championships was held on 3 December 2017.

Schedule

Medalists

Records

Results

References

External links
Results 

Women's 75 kg
2017 in women's weightlifting